The 2019–20 Greek A2 Basket League was the 34th season of the Greek A2 Basket League, the second-tier level professional club basketball league in Greece. The league was organized by the Hellenic Basketball Federation. It was the fifth season with the participation of 16 teams. The season was prematurely cancelled, due to the COVID-19 pandemic. Due to that, none of the league's teams were relegated.

Teams

Regular season (final league standings)

Source: Basket.gr

* Diagoras Dryopideon declined to be promoted to the Greek Basket League.

** Olympiacos B started the season with a 6-point deduction, a rebuke imposed by the Hellenic Basketball Federation as a result of senior club Olympiacos's forfeiting of several Greek Basket League and Greek Cup games, during the 2018–19 season.

Promotion playoffs

Cancelled due to COVID-19 pandemic

Relegation playoffs

Cancelled due to COVID-19 pandemic

See also
2019–20 Greek Basketball Cup
2019–20 Greek Basket League (1st tier)

References

External links
Greek A2 Basketball League
Hellenic Basketball Federation 

Greek A2 Basket League
Greek
2019–20 in Greek basketball